SM UB-117 was a German Type UB III submarine or U-boat in the Imperial German Navy during World War I. She was commissioned into the Imperial German Navy on 6 May 1918 as SM UB-117.

UB-117 was surrendered to the British on 26 November 1918 and broken up in Felixstowe in 1919 / 20.

Construction

She was built by Blohm & Voss of Hamburg and following just under a year of construction, launched at Hamburg on 21 November 1917. UB-117 was commissioned in the spring the next year under the command of Kptlt. Erwin Waßner. Like all Type UB III submarines, UB-117 carried 10 torpedoes and was armed with a  deck gun. UB-117 had a displacement of  while surfaced and  when submerged. Her engines enabled her to travel at  when surfaced and  when submerged.

Summary of raiding history

References

Notes

Citations

Bibliography

 

German Type UB III submarines
World War I submarines of Germany
U-boats commissioned in 1918
1917 ships
Ships built in Hamburg